is a National University Corporation (legal entity) includes 2 universities, Nagoya University and Gifu University, both are located in Tōkai region, Japan.

History 
NUC = National University Corporation

In April 2004, National University Corporation Nagoya University and National University Corporation Gifu University established by the National University Corporation Act. Nagoya University and Gifu University be national universities established by their respective corporations.
In March 2018, NUC Nagoya University is designated as a Designated National University corporation.
In December 2018, NUC Nagoya University and NUC Gifu University conclude an agreement on the integration of corporations.
In May 2019, The National Diet amends the law. It was announced that the National University Corporation Tokai National Higher Education and Research System will be newly established in 2020.
On April 1, 2020, The Tokai National Higher Education and Research System (THERS) was established.

Members 
Gifu University
Nagoya University

See also
 National University Corporation
 Imperial Universities
 List of national universities in Japan
List of universities in Japan
Education in Japan
National university

References

External links 
 THERS Official website

School Corporations in Japan
Japanese national universities
Lists of universities and colleges in Japan